Carlia vivax, the lively rainbow-skink or tussock rainbow-skink, is a species of skink in the genus Carlia. It is endemic to New South Wales and Queensland in Australia.

References

Carlia
Reptiles described in 1884
Endemic fauna of Australia
Skinks of Australia
Taxa named by Charles Walter De Vis